Paepalanthus bromelioides is a species in the flowering plant family Eriocaulaceae. This family is placed in the Poales, close to the Bromeliaceae, whose morphology this genus shares. Paepalanthus bromelioides is native to Cerrado, the area in which the carnivorous bromeliad Brocchinia reducta is also found. There is some speculation that the occasional insects trapped in the urn of this plant are evidence of its being a carnivorous plant or protocarnivorous, possible deriving nutrients from termite mounds that termites frequently make in the plants' roots.

References

Eriocaulaceae
Carnivorous plants